The large moth family Gelechiidae contains the following genera:

Zeempista
Zelosyne
Zizyphia

References

 Natural History Museum Lepidoptera genus database

Gelechiidae
Gelechiid